"No Role Modelz" is a song by American rapper J. Cole, taken from his third studio album, 2014 Forest Hills Drive. The song samples "Don't Save Her" by Project Pat, and was produced by Phonix Beats and J. Cole. During the week of December 22, 2015, the song reached number 36 on the Billboard Hot 100, giving Cole his fourth top 40 hit as a solo artist and the highest-charting single from 2014 Forest Hills Drive. On May 20, 2016, the single was officially certified platinum by the Recording Industry Association of America (RIAA).

Critical reception
"No Role Modelz" received mixed reviews from music critics. Craig Jenkins of Pitchfork wrote that "No Role Modelz" parlays a suspicion about a hook-up being a golddigger into a tirade about reality T.V women lacking respectable public figures crudely suggesting that "she's shallow but the pussy deep." Jenkins wrote 2014 Forest Hills Drive often plays at a depth it never delivers."

Charts

Weekly charts

Year-end charts

Certifications

References

External links

2014 songs
J. Cole songs
Songs written by J. Cole
Song recordings produced by J. Cole
Songs written by Juicy J
Songs written by E-40
Songs written by DJ Paul
Roc Nation singles